Murachek (also Romanized as Marūchek and Marūchak; also known as Marūch and Marooch Janbe’ Mahmood Abad) is a village in Baqeran Rural District, in the Central District of Birjand County, South Khorasan Province, Iran. At the 2006 census, its population was 18 persons in 8 families.

References 

Populated places in Birjand County